Riegel is a German surname. Notable people with the surname include:

Anton Pius Riegel (1789–?), Austrian architect
Bill Reigel (1932-1993) American basketball player and coach
E.C. Riegel (1879–1953), independent scholar, author and consumer advocate
Eden Riegel (born 1981), American actress
Ella Riegel (1867 - 1937), American suffragist
Franz Riegel (1843–1904), German internist and gastroenterologist
Hans Riegel (1923–2013), German entrepreneur 
Hans Riegel Sr. (1893-1945), German entrepreneur
Jan Riegel (born 1980), Czech footballer
Sam Riegel (born 1976), American voice actor, writer and director 
Skee Riegel (1914–2009), American golfer
Tatiana S. Riegel, American film editor

See also
Riegels (surname)
Reuben Reigel's Covered Bridge
Alois Riegl

German-language surnames